Laksam is an upazila of Comilla District in the Division of Chittagong, Bangladesh. Laksam is widely known as the birthplace of Nawab Faizunnesa Chowdhurani.

History 
Laksam was made into an upazila in 1983. On 6 April 1971 more than 200 people were killed by Pakistani army at Ajgara Bazar during the Bangladesh Liberation war. The Pakistan army was defeated on 12 December 1971 in the upazila. During the course of the war, 17 freedom fighters died along with numerous Pakistani soldiers. The upazila has experienced a water crisis due to arsenic in the groundwater.

Geography
It is bounded by Comilla Sadar and Barura upazilas on the north, Chatkhil, Begumganj and Senbagh upazilas on the south, Nangalkot and Chauddagram upazilas on the east, Barura and Shahrasti upazilas on the west. The main rivers are Dakatia and Little Feni.

Places of interest

Kaliapur Pak Dharbar Sharif
3 domed Kazir Mosque; 
10 domed Nawab Bari Mosque;
Paschimgaon Nawab Bari;
3 domed Afrannesa Mosque (1869);
Atulchandra Zamidar Bari;
Sree Sree Jagannath Bari Devalaya;
Jagannath Dighi.

Administration 
Laksham Upazila is divided into Laksham Municipality and seven union parishads: Azgora, Bakoi, Gobindapur, Laksam Purba, Kandirpar, MudafarGonj, and Uttarda. The union parishads are subdivided into 136 mauzas and 178 villages.

Laksham Municipality is subdivided into 9 wards and 31 mahallas.

Transport
Laksam Railway Junction, on the Akhaura-Laksam-Chittagong Line, Laksam-Noakhali Line and Laksam-Chandpur Line is one of the two biggest junctions of Bangladesh. From here people go to Chandpur District, Noakhali District.

Extinct mediums of transport 
Motor launch, bullock drawn cart, palanquin, horse drawn carriage.

Rivers 

 Dakatia
 Choto Feni
 Curzon Canal

Fruits and crops 
Main fruits include jackfruit, litchi, mango, carambola. Main crops include paddy, wheat, potato, seasonal vegetables.

Notable residents
 Nawab Faizunnesa Chowdhurani, philanthropist and social worker, was born at Paschimgaon village, Pourva Laksam, in 1834.
 Muhammad Abdul Malek (born 1969), Islamic scholar, academic and researcher
 Muhammad Shamsul Haque, former Foreign Minister of Bangladesh
 Md. Tajul Islam, Minister of Local Government and Rural Development (2019–present), was elected from Laksham.
 Biplob Bhattacharjee, former goalkeeper and current goalkeeping coach of Bangladesh National Football Team

Education 

 Al Amin Institute (High school at Dargah Road, Paschimgaon)
 Nawab Faizunnesa and Badrunnesa Joint High School (also known as NFBN high school, situated at Paschimgaon, Laksam-Pouroshova)
 Laksam Government Pilot High School (High school at New Road)
 Nawab Fayzunesa Govt. College Laksam (Government college at Paschimgaon)
Laksam Pilot Girls High School

Sports 

 1st Division Football League
 Volleyball League is held every year
 Inter-union football competition and Inter-school various sports competitions

Newspapers 
Weekly Laksam, Weekly Laksam Barta, Weekly Alor Dishari, Weekly Somoyer Dorpon, Weekly Naxi Barta, Weekly Joy Kantha, Daily Torun Kantho.

References

 
Upazilas of Comilla District